Eurhinodelphinidae is an extinct family of toothed whales which lived from the Oligocene to the Miocene.  Members of the family possessed an elongated jaw similar in appearance to a swordfish.

Taxonomy

Family Eurhinodelphinidae
Ceterhinops
Eurhinodelphis
Iniopsis
Mycteriacetus
 Phocaenopsis
Schizodelphis
Vanbreenia
Xiphiacetus
Ziphiodelphis

References

Prehistoric toothed whales
Prehistoric mammal families